Greentown is a census-designated place (CDP) in Stark County, Ohio, United States. The population was 3,804 at the 2010 census. It is part of the Canton-Massillon, OH Metropolitan Statistical Area.

History
Greentown was platted in 1816. The community was formerly located in Green Township, hence the name.

Geography

Demographics

As of the census of 2010, there were 3,804 people, 1,353 households, and 1,093 families residing in the CDP. The population density was 1,408.9 people per square mile (535.8/km2). There were 1,398 housing units at an average density of 517.8/sq mi (196.9/km2). The racial makeup of the CDP was 94.53% White, 1.55% African American, 0.18% Native American, 1.78% Asian, 0.50% from other races, and 1.44% from two or more races. Hispanic or Latino of any race were 1.63% of the population.

There were 1,353 households, out of which 38.3% had children under the age of 18 living with them, 69.9% were married couples living together, 7.6% had a female householder with no husband present, and 19.2% were non-families. 16.0% of all households were made up of individuals, and 5.1% had someone living alone who was 65 years of age or older. The average household size was 2.81 and the average family size was 3.15.

In the CDP the population was spread out, with 30.1% under the age of 19, 4.5% from 19 to 24, 25.4% from 25 to 44, 30.6% from 45 to 64, and 9.4% who were 65 years of age or older. The median age was 39.1 years. For every 100 females there were 98.7 males. For every 100 females age 18 and over, there were 98.1 males.

The median income for a household in the CDP was $84,944, and the median income for a family was $101,414. Males had a median income of $63,307 versus $46,558 for females. The per capita income for the CDP was $31,148. About 3.4% of families and 4.6% of the population were below the poverty line, including none of those under age 18 and 13.2% of those age 65 or over.

School district
Greentown lies in the North Canton school district. The district includes Greentown Intermediate School, serving 500 students in grades 3–5.  Greentown Intermediate used to be a high school, but was merged with the North Canton City Schools, when it became an elementary school, followed by an intermediate school.

References
https://factfinder.census.gov/bkmk/cf/1.0/en/place/Greentown CDP, Ohio

External links

Census-designated places in Stark County, Ohio